The 25th Division was one of the divisions of the Spanish Republican Army that were organized during the Spanish Civil War on the basis of the Mixed Brigades. It participated in the battles of Huesca, Belchite, Teruel and Levante.

History 
The division was created in April 1937, within the incipient Eastern Army. It was organized from the old Jubert Division, which in turn had been the former Ortiz Column of anarchist militiamen.

The new unit was made up of the 116th, 117th, 118th mixed brigades, and a few weeks later was integrated into the also recently created 12th Army Corps. In June it participated in the Huesca Offensive. On the night of June 9–10, troops from the 25th Division began a diversionary action on the enemy front, occupying various positions; The general operation, however, did not yield the desired results and would eventually fail. At the end of August some of its units took part in the Zaragoza Offensive —especially, the 116th Mixed Brigade, standing out significantly during the Battle of Belchite. However, the commander of the division, Antonio Ortiz Ramírez, was dismissed after the battle of Belchite and replaced by Miguel García Vivancos.

In December, during the Battle of Teruel, it was integrated together with the 11th Division into the 22nd Army Corps. The forces of the 25th Division managed to conquer the Old Cemetery, the Hermitage of Santa Bárbara and the position of «El Mansueto» , although they came out of the fighting very broken. After the battle was over, the unit was placed in the rear as a reserve force. During the Aragon Offensive, in March 1938, the unit was forced to withdraw due to enemy pressure. It ended up retreating to the south of the Ebro, after the Republican zone was cut in two. During these weeks the division was attached to various army corps.

Later it was integrated into the 17th Army Corps, together with the 40th and 65th divisions. Between May and July it intervened very actively in the Levante Offensive, taking outstanding action during the republican defense of Caudiel. For the remainder of the war, the unit remained at rest, not participating in any further interventions.

Leaders 
Commanders
 Antonio Ortiz Ramírez;
 Miguel García Vivancos;
 Manuel Cristóbal Errandonea;
 Eusebio Sanz Asensio;
 Víctor Álvarez González

Commissars
 Saturnino Carod Lerín;
 Antonio Ejarque Pina

Chief of Staff
 Alfredo Navarro Sanganetti

Battles

See also
Spanish Republican Army
List of Spanish Republican divisions

Notes

References

Bibliography 
 
 
 
 
 
 
 
 
 
 
 
 
 
 
 

Military units and formations established in 1937
Military units and formations disestablished in 1939
Divisions of Spain
Military units and formations of the Spanish Civil War
Military history of Spain
Armed Forces of the Second Spanish Republic
1937 establishments in Spain
1937 disestablishments in Spain
Militarized anarchist formations